Worklife (Previously Business Edition and Business Live) is a news programme that premiered on BBC World News on 1 February 2010 as part of a network-wide refresh. The programme is presented by Tanya Beckett (Monday–Thursday) and Jamie Robertson (Friday). The programme examines the inner workings of business, translating complex financial stories to give viewers a clearer understanding of the rapidly changing global economy, and how it will impact on their lives. It also includes the top global news stories of the day as well as weather updates.

The current presenting line up is Sally Bundock with either David Eades or Karin Giannone in the morning.

In 2015 the programme was relaunched as Business Live with two editions one at 08:30BST/GMT and 20:00BST/GMT. Originally there was only one morning edition but was expanded to two in November.

History

Business Edition was reduced from 60 to 45 then to a 30-minute structure on 9 November 2010. The programme was replaced with an edition of BBC World News from April 2011. Business Edition with Tanya Beckett returned to BBC World News on 18 June 2012 at 22:00 GMT. This was originally an edition of World News Today: Business Edition. In June 2015 the program was ended to allow Outside Source and World News Today to be simulcast on the BBC News Channel.

It returned in November 2015 replacing an edition of World News Today under the name Business Live.

On 7 October 2019, Business Live was renamed to Worklife to reflect with sister programme Worklife India and its BBC Worklife website.

About the programme
Morning edition

This edition is presented live from London with two presenters and broadcast on BBC News Channel and BBC World News at 0830 GMT/BST (0930 CET). It gives the latest in Europe, Asia closing view, US recap.

After the top story, the headlines will be presented from the catwalk. Then, it switches to the presenter sitting at the desk. After that, the catwalk presenter will present the programme in the first half of the show. After the look at the markets segment they will join at the desk with a guest. In the last half, they will have a look at social media segment and then the business papers review.
This was the first edition of the programme until November 2015 when its second edition launched in the evening.

Evening edition

This edition is presented live from London and New York. Tanya Beckett and Michelle Fleury are the main presenters and the show is broadcast at 2000 GMT/BST (2100 CET) only on BBC World News.

During the top stories, the New York presenter will appear first, then the London presenter at the desk. The headlines intro is the same as the morning edition. The programme is mainly presented from the catwalk in Studio C, New Broadcasting House, London. This was originally an edition of World News Today and replaced the Business Edition which was broadcast at 2100 GMT/BST (2200 CET), Business Edition was also an edition of World News Today until 2010, but was replaced by Outside Source in June 2015.

Presenters

Former presenters

References

External links

 (2010–2012)

2010 British television series debuts
2020s British television series
BBC World News shows
Business-related television series in the United Kingdom